The 1938 Texas Mines Miners football team was an American football team that represented Texas School of Mines (now known as University of Texas at El Paso) as a member of the Border Conference during the 1938 college football season. In its tenth season under head coach Mack Saxon, the team compiled a 6–3 record (3–2 against Border Conference opponents), finished fourth in the conference, and outscored opponents by a total of 153 to 72.

Schedule

References

Texas Mines
UTEP Miners football seasons
Texas Mines Miners football